UFC 11: The Proving Ground was a mixed martial arts event held by the Ultimate Fighting Championship on September 20, 1996, at the Augusta Civic Center in Augusta, Georgia. The event was broadcast live on pay-per-view in the United States, and later released on home video.

History
The card featured an eight-man tournament, as well as two alternate bouts in case of an injury, and to fill time for the pay-per-view broadcast.

Due to multiple injuries and fatigue, no alternates were able to continue after their semifinal matches.

Roberto Traven had a broken hand after his alternate match and the championship was won by forfeit.

Rich Goins returned as the ring announcer.

The event, with only a buyrate of 92,000, was one of the least purchased UFC events.

This was the first and only UFC tournament to end by default.

Due to Mark Coleman winning by default, and the vast amount of short matches, the PPV has been called "Incomplete" and "disorganised" by viewers.

Igor Vovchanchyn was invited to fight at UFC 11, but could not participate due to visa issues as well as dissatisfaction with the offer.

Results

UFC 11 bracket

1Jerry Bohlander withdrew due to injury. He was replaced by Scott Ferrozzo.
2 Scott Ferrozzo was unable to continue due to exhaustion, making Mark Coleman winner by walkover.

See also 
 Ultimate Fighting Championship
 List of UFC champions
 List of UFC events
 1996 in UFC

References

External links
UFC 11 results at Sherdog.com
UFC 11 fight reviews
Official UFC website

Ultimate Fighting Championship events
1996 in mixed martial arts
Mixed martial arts in Georgia (U.S. state)
Sports in Augusta, Georgia
1996 in Georgia (U.S. state)
Sports competitions in Georgia (U.S. state)